IFIC may mean:

IFIC Bank, a private commercial bank in Bangladesh
Interim Forum for an Independence Convention, another term for Independence Convention, supporters of Scottish independence
NDLC-IFIC Bank, Pakistan
International Food Information Council
International Federation of Infection Control
International Feed-In Cooperation
Instituto de Física Corpuscular, a particle physics research center in Valencia, Spain.
Investment Fund Institute of Canada
A slogan for Beech-Nut chewing gum; an abbreviation of "it's flavor-ific"